Kocelj ( 861–874) was a ruler of the Slavs in Lower Pannonia. He was an East Frankish vassal titled comes (count), and is believed to have ruled between 861 or 864 and 876.

Life
Kocelj was the second son of Pribina, a Slavic dux installed by the Franks in Lower Pannonia in ca. 838 or 840. Bowlus believes he was born in ca. 820. In 861, Kocelj made a significant donation to the Freising monastery, showing that he had a solid social and political standing. According to Bowlus, this document indicates that Pribina had died, and Kocelj succeeded him. Louis the German installed Kocel as a ruler in Lower Pannonia in 864. Kocelj held "Lower Pannonia" (Pannonia inferioris) in 865, when Archbishop Adalwin of Salzburg visited his lands twice. In 869, Kocel had requested for Byzantine missionary Methodius to be sent into Pannonia as a papal legate. In midsummer, Kocelj sent Methodius to Rome with twenty men to petition for his elevation to bishop. Hadrian II appointed Methodius the archbishop of Sirmium, and sent confirmations to, among others, Kocel, whose land lay within the jurisdiction. Frankish Pannonia was held by Kocel and Bavarian margraves in 871; Kocel enjoyed independence, as evident from his talks with the pope. In 874, following the Moravian conflict, Kocel continued to rule the Drava Valley, presumably under Carloman of the March of Pannonia. Kocelj disappears from sources after 874, and was either dead or removed from his office  876, certainly dead by 880.

Identification
Kocel has been identified with Frankish military commander Kotzil mentioned in De Administrando Imperio regarding the armed revolt by the Croats who were led by their Duke Domagoj who "managed to prevail and killed all the Franks and their archon, called Kotzil", most probably in 874 which coincides with Kocel's disappearance from the sources.

Titles
"Count of Slavs" (comes de Sclavis nomine Chezul), 861 Latin gift deed
"Duke" (Chezil dux), posthumously between 876 and 880

Annotations

References

Sources

820s births
870s deaths
9th-century rulers in Europe
9th-century Slavs
9th-century people from East Francia
9th-century Hungarian people
Medieval Slovenian people